Pryteria costata is a moth in the family Erebidae. It was described by Heinrich Benno Möschler in 1882. It is found in Suriname and French Guiana.

References

Moths described in 1882
Phaegopterina